Alexander Medawar Garland (born 26 May 1970) is an English writer and filmmaker. He rose to prominence as a novelist in the late 1990s with his novel The Beach, which led some critics to call Garland a key voice of Generation X. He subsequently received praise for the screenplays of the films 28 Days Later (2002), Sunshine (2007), both directed by Danny Boyle, Never Let Me Go (2010), and Dredd (2012). He co-wrote the video game Enslaved: Odyssey to the West (2010) and was a story supervisor on DmC: Devil May Cry (2013).

In 2014, Garland made his directorial debut with Ex Machina, a science fiction-thriller that explores the emergence of artificial general intelligence. The film earned him an Academy Award nomination for Best Original Screenplay and won three British Independent Film awards for Best Screenplay, Best Director, and Best British Independent Film. His second film, Annihilation (2018), based on the 2014 novel by Jeff VanderMeer, was also a critical success. In 2020, he wrote and directed the miniseries Devs for FX on Hulu. Men, his latest film, produced in collaboration with A24, was released in May 2022 and received generally favorable reviews.

Early life
Garland was born in London, England, the son of psychologist Caroline (née Medawar) and political cartoonist Nicholas Garland. He has a younger brother and two older paternal half-siblings. His maternal grandparents are Nobel Prize–winning British biologist Peter Medawar and writer Jean Medawar.

He was educated at University College School and later attended and graduated from the University of Manchester with a degree in History of Art.

Career

Novels
Garland's first novel, The Beach, was published in 1996. Based upon Garland's travels across Europe and Thailand, it tells the story of a young English backpacker who discovers an unspoiled seashore occupied by a community of like-minded backpackers. The novel is noted for its references to drug culture, sequences of hallucinations, and unique depictions of excess and utopia. The Beach was initially met with positive reviews, and with a spreading word of mouth response, the novel grew in popularity. Garland would later speak of his discomfort with the fame The Beach brought him. "I never felt comfortable with it (the novel)." The Beach has been translated into 25 different languages and sold close to 700,000 copies by the start of 1999. It was developed into a film starring Leonardo DiCaprio. In 2003, the novel was Ranked 103 in BBC's The Big Read poll.

Garland's The Tesseract (1998) is a non-linear narrative with several interwoven characters, set in Manila, Philippines. The novel is characterized by a post-modernist narrative style and structure. It explores several themes such as love and violence through each character's circumstance and context of surroundings as well as seemingly inconsequential actions and the repercussions of those actions on other characters. The Tesseract did not enjoy the critical or commercial success of The Beach, but it too has a film adaptation.

Throughout his career and work, Garland has expressed his love of travel (particularly backpacking) and his love of Manila, much of which influenced his work.

Film
In 2002, Garland wrote the screenplay for Danny Boyle's 28 Days Later, starring Cillian Murphy. He has said that the script was influenced by 1970s zombie films and British science fiction like The Day of the Triffids. Video games such as the Resident Evil series also served as an influence for 28 Days Later, with Garland crediting the first game for revitalizing the zombie genre. Inspiration for the "Rage" virus came from real-world infections such as Ebola and filoviruses. He won a Best Screenplay honor at the 2004 Fangoria Chainsaw Awards for his script of the film.

In 2005, Garland wrote a screenplay for a film adaptation of Halo. D. B. Weiss and Josh Olson rewrote this during 2006 for a 2008 release, although the film was later canceled. In 2007, he wrote the screenplay for the film Sunshine, which was his second screenplay to be directed by Danny Boyle and to star Cillian Murphy. Garland served as an executive producer on 28 Weeks Later, the sequel of 28 Days Later. He wrote the screenplay for the 2010 film Never Let Me Go, based on the novel by Kazuo Ishiguro. He also wrote the script for Dredd, an adaptation of the Judge Dredd comic book series from 2000 AD. In 2018, Karl Urban, who played the eponymous role in the film, stated that it was Garland who deserved credit for also directing Dredd.

Garland made his directorial debut with Ex Machina, a 2014 feature film based on his own story and screenplay. Starring Domhnall Gleeson, Alicia Vikander and Oscar Isaac. the film won a Jury Prize at the 2015 Gerardmer Film Festival and earned Garland a nomination for an Academy Award for Best Original Screenplay.

Garland's second film, Annihilation (2018), was based on Jeff VanderMeer's 2014 science fiction novel of the same name. Garland has described it as "an adaptation [that] was a memory of the book," rather than book-referenced screenwriting, to capture the "dream like nature" and tone of his reading experience. Production began in 2016, and the film was released in February 2018.

In January 2021, Garland was hired to direct his third film, Men, which stars Jessie Buckley and Rory Kinnear. The film follows a young woman who goes on a solo vacation to the English countryside after the death of her ex-husband. The following year, it was announced that Garland was reteaming with A24 for his fourth feature, Civil War, an action epic starring Kirsten Dunst, Wagner Moura, and previous collaborators Stephen McKinley Henderson and Cailee Spaeny.

Television
Garland wrote, served as executive producer, and directed the eight-episode miniseries Devs, about the "mysterious ongoings at a tech company", for FX; the series was greenlit in August 2018, and premiered 5 March 2020 on FX on Hulu. It stars Ex Machina and Annihilation actress Sonoya Mizuno, alongside Nick Offerman, Jin Ha, Zach Grenier, Stephen McKinley Henderson, Cailee Spaeny, and Alison Pill. Spaeny, who did not audition for the role as Garland had wanted her specifically for it, stated that Devs was short for Development, and that the series would explore the idea of the multiverse.

Video games
Garland and Tameem Antoniades co-wrote the video game Enslaved: Odyssey to the West for the PlayStation 3 and Xbox 360. They won a 2011 award from the Writer's Guild of Great Britain. Garland also served as a story supervisor on the game DmC: Devil May Cry in 2013.

Personal life
Garland is married to actress Paloma Baeza and has two children.

Bibliography
 The Beach (1996)
 The Tesseract (1998)
 The Coma (2004)

Filmography
Films

Television

Video games

Collaborators
Since he made his directorial debut, Garland has worked with several actors multiple times.

Critical reception

Awards and nominations

References

External links
 
 Backpacker Blues: Spike Magazine interview with Alex Garland
 Beach Boy: Salon interview with Alex Garland
 "Alex Garland is writing Judge Dredd"

1970 births
Alumni of the University of Manchester
20th-century English novelists
21st-century English novelists
English screenwriters
English male screenwriters
Living people
People educated at University College School
Postmodern writers
Film directors from London
Writers from London
Science fiction film directors
English people of Lebanese descent
Video game writers
English male novelists
Directors Guild of America Award winners
20th-century English male writers
21st-century English male writers